Toughest Place To Be A... is a BBC Two television documentary which offered various working or retired professionals in the United Kingdom a different and more challenging working environment in the same profession they worked in. These individuals travel to a foreign country to learn and work under the new environment for ten days. First broadcast in February 2011, a total of fifteen episodes were produced since. In the United States the programme is aired on Al Jazeera America.

Episodes

Series 1

Series 2

Series 3

Series 4

The Return
The workers from the first two series return to the countries that challenged them, revisiting the hosts that accommodated them and testing the skills they learned from their past experiences.

Response
In the episodes, the plight of the difficult situation faced by the hosts (who housed and gave on-job training to the British professional) in the foreign countries can be noticed. For the case of fishing, the episode's broadcast has led to a supportive response from the UK fishing industry and the setting up of a fundraising charity for fishing communities in Sierra Leone. Joshua West's experience with Rogelio Castro, a jeepney driver whom he stayed with in Manila, led to him starting a charity effort to provide for the education of Castro's grandchildren as well as other impoverished children in the city.

References

External links
 

2011 British television series debuts
2013 British television series endings
BBC television documentaries
Al Jazeera America original programming
English-language television shows